Allagadda is a town in Nandyal district of the Indian state of Andhra Pradesh. It is located in Nandyal Revenue division. Allagadda Town Council is the 5th largest ULB in the Nandyal district of Andhra Pradesh. It was established as Town Council in the year 2011. It is located at 15°08’00” N 78°31.00 E Coordinates 15°08’00” N 78°31’00” E. It is the Headquarters of the Mandal as well as the Revenue Division and is located at about 40 km, from Allagadda, the district headquarters. It is located 40 km from Allagadda is on National Highway 40 and is the border of the districts Nandyal and Kadapa. It is situated 30 Km from Ahobilam is Major Pilgrim Centre in Allagadda Mandal . It has an extent of 62.30 Sq KM.

Allagadda is 112 km from Kurnool and 40 Km from Nandyal on National Highway 40.

Politics 
During the 2019 election, Gangula Brijendra Reddy (Nani) was elected as the Member of the Legislative Assembly (MLA) for the Allagadda Assembly Constituency.

Transport 
The Andhra Pradesh State Road Transport Corporation operates bus services from allagadda Depot.
The nearest railway station Nandyal Junction is from 38 km away from the town  Kurnool 
airport is from 92Km

Cuddapah airport is 85 km away from Allagadda.

History 
The history of Allagadda dates back to the second century BC. The evidence from the Archaeological Survey of India suggests that it started Mourya Empire and Satavahana dynasty And since then it has been under the rule of numerous dynasties including Chalukya Cholas and Pallava. Among all of these dynasties, the first one to rule over Allagadda was the Pallava dynasty. 

After Pallava Rashtrakutas ruled over Allagadda.

From 1336 - To 1647 almost 310 years Allagadda was under the Vijayanagara kingdom during this time so many temples were built by Vijayanagara Kings

Which was built between 14th CE and 16th CE
Following the Treaty of Seringapatam the Tippu Sultan accepted to give his northern territory to the Nizam of Hyderabad in 1792 AD.

In 1796 AD, the then Nizam Asaf Jah II, harassed by the Marathas and Tipu Sultan, opted to get British military protection under Lord Wellesley's doctrine of Subsidiary Alliance. Now, as a part of this agreement, the Nizam ceded a large portion of the acquired territory to the British, to be added to the Madras Presidency. Between 1746 To 1799 allagadda was under the Bijapur Nawabs ruling independently until 1799, when the British acquired Ceded Districts in 1800 from Nizam of Hyderabad state allagadda came under the direct control of the British and merged with Cuddapah District in 1801. later it was merged with the Kurnool district when Kurnool came under British control from the last nawab of Kurnool on 12 July 1840.

In 2022 April the Government of Andhra Pradesh  created a new District, With Nandyal as the district and district headquarters allagadda was merged with Nandyal District.

References

Further reading 
 "Rise and Fall of Allagadda" by Guru Venkatesh
 "Allagadda: Heaven on Earth" by Guru Venkatesh

Cities and towns in Nandyal district